6.12. (Live in Helsinki in the United States) is Värttinä's 9th album and first live album, released on 3 September 2001. It was recorded in the Finland Independence Day, 6 December 2000.

All songs on 6.12. appear on earlier Värttinä studio albums. 6.12. has less-varied instrumentation than their studio albums (after Oi Dai).

After being realized in Finland by BMG Finland, 6.12. was released by Resistencia in Spain in 2001. In 2002, it was released in Germany, Austria and Switzerland by Westpark, in Benelux by Frea, and in the United States by NorthSide.

Track listing
All tracks were arranged by Värttinä, except for "Käppee" by Mari Kaasinen

Also includes "Äijö" video

Personnel
Susan Aho – vocals, percussion
Mari Kaasinen – vocals
Kirsi Kähkönen – vocals
Riikka Timonen – vocals
Janne Lappalainen – bouzouki, saxophone
Markku Lepistö – accordion
Pekka Lehti – double bass
Kari Reiman – violin
Marko Timonen – drums, percussion
Antto Varilo – guitars

On the video, new members Johanna Virtanen and Jaska Lukkarinen replace Riikka Timonen and  Marko Timonen, respectively.

References

External links
Värttinä page with samples 
Aijö video 

Värttinä albums
2001 live albums